Hur In-hoi (born 24 July 1987) is a South Korean professional golfer.

Hur plays on the Korean Tour where he has four wins. He also played on the Japan Golf Tour where he had one win.

Professional wins (6)

Japan Golf Tour wins (1)

Korean Tour wins (4)

Japan Challenge Tour wins (1)

References

External links

South Korean male golfers
Japan Golf Tour golfers
1987 births
Living people